Raja Gazaffar is an Indian politician and a member of the 1996 Uttar Pradesh Legislative Assembly election who represents the Bijnor (Assembly constituency) constituency Uttar Pradesh party Bahujan Samaj Party in office October 1996 and May 2002.

References 

Year of birth missing
Possibly living people
Uttar Pradesh MLAs 1997–2002
Bahujan Samaj Party politicians
People from Bijnor district
Bahujan Samaj Party politicians from Uttar Pradesh